is a football stadium located in Ōmiya-ku, Saitama city, Saitama Prefecture, Japan. It is the home stadium of J2 League club Omiya Ardija.

It was formerly known as Omiya Football Stadium. Since 14 May 2007 it has been called  for the naming rights.

History
Built in 1960, it was one of the first stadia in Japan dedicated to the code.
The grandstands were added to host several matches of 1964 Summer Olympics and 1967 National Sports Festival of Japan.  
The stadium used to accommodate 12,500 spectators.

In 2006-2007 it was closed for expansion works to meet the J. League Division 1 requirements for Ardija to host its home matches. Ardija used Saitama Stadium 2002 and Urawa Komaba Stadium until works were complete.

The expansion works were complete in October 2007 and since it accommodates 15,500 spectators.

On 11 November, the re-opening match was held as a J. League season match between the Ardija and Oita Trinita (1-2).

A fun fact about the stadium is that this is the venue for the High School National Championships on the football manga-anime "Captain Tsubasa"

References

1964 Summer Olympics official report. Volume 1. Part 1. p. 133.
 Omiya Ardija stadium

External links
 
 FM NACK5

Football venues in Japan
Omiya Ardija
Venues of the 1964 Summer Olympics
Olympic football venues
Sports venues in Saitama (city)
Sports venues completed in 1960
1960 establishments in Japan